Elections to Rossendale Borough Council were held on 1 May 2008.  One third of the council was up for election and the Conservative party gained overall control of the council from no overall control. Overall turnout was up by one per cent from the last election in 2007 at 36.3%.

The Conservative party gained three seats in the election including Worsley, the seat of the former Conservative leader of the council, Duncan Ruddick, who had defected from the party in 2007 to become an independent councillor. The Liberal Democrats gained one seat, while the Labour party lost three seats, with one defeated Labour councillor, Tina Durkin, blaming the Prime Minister Gordon Brown for the losses.

After the election, the composition of the council was
Conservative 21
Labour 11
Liberal Democrat 3
Independent 1

Election result

Ward results

References

2008 Rossendale election result
Ward results
Rossendale Borough results

2008
2008 English local elections
2000s in Lancashire